The Second Council of Dvin was a church Synod or ecumenical Council held in 554 in the city of Dvin (then in Sasanian Armenia).

The Second Council of Dvin was called by Catholicos Nerses II of Bagrevand, and the bishops declined to accept the canons of Chalcedon. This was significant as it was the moment where the Armenian church declined to accept the dyophysite formula that had been adopted by the majority of Christendom at the Council of Chalcedon. This decision was made because of the Armenians' observation that the decrees of Chalcedon had caused the doctrine of Nestorius to spread.

Impact of the Council
This rejection marks the point of separation between the Armenian Apostolic Church and Oriental Orthodoxy more generally from the rest of Christendom (the Eastern Orthodox Church and Roman Catholic Church were still united).

The Council also marks the beginning of the Armenian Church Calendar, and also established various administration and conduct rules and regulations for members of the Armenian Church.

See also
First Council of Dvin
Third Council of Dvin

References 

6th-century church councils
554
Second Council
Armenian Apostolic Church
6th century in Armenia
Christianity in the Sasanian Empire
Sasanian Armenia
Governing assemblies of religious organizations